West Coast Bad Boyz, Vol. 3: Poppin' Collars is the fourth and final to date West Coast Bad Boyz compilation album. It was released on March 19, 2002 through New No Limit Records. Poppin Collars was not much of a success, only peaking at #108 on the Billboard 200 and #28 on the Top R&B/Hip-Hop Albums.

Track listing

References

External links
 [ West Coast Bad Boyz, Vol. 3] at Allmusic
 West Coast Bad Boyz, Vol. 3 at Tower Records

Albums produced by Timbaland
Hip hop compilation albums
2002 compilation albums
No Limit Records compilation albums
Priority Records compilation albums
Gangsta rap compilation albums